Mamerto Urriolagoitia Harriague (5 December 1895 – 4 June 1974) was a Bolivian lawyer and politician who was the 43rd president of Bolivia, from 1949 to 1951. A member of the Republican Socialist Unity Party, he had previously been the 26th vice president of Bolivia, from 1947 to 1949, under President Enrique Hertzog.

Biography
Of privileged background, he studied in France and later joined the Bolivian diplomatic service. In 1947, Urriolagoitia was elected vice-president to Dr. Enrique Hertzog and endured the constant pressures for reform emanating from the poorest sectors of society. A hard-liner when it came to dealing with the opposition, he was preferred by the threatened conservative elites who, in 1949, forced President Hertzog to resign. Thus, Urriolagoitia became chief executive and immediately stepped up the repression of the reformist movement which was growing around the Movimiento Nacionalista Revolucionario (Nationalist Revolutionary Movement) of Víctor Paz Estenssoro, Juan Lechín, Hernán Siles Zuazo, and others. A counter-reaction took place and a series of violent nationwide rebellions catalyzed the so-called Civil War of May–September 1949. The Urriolagoitia government barely regained control of the situation, but the die was cast on the moribund "Oligarchic State" of 1880–1936, resuscitated only temporarily (1940–43 and 1946–52) by the economic and mining interests that upheld it.

By the 1951 presidential elections, time finally caught up with the old system, and the opposition party, led by Víctor Paz Estenssoro, was declared the winner, despite the fact that under the law only about 200,000 privileged, educated and propertied Bolivians could vote.

Urriolagoitia refused to give power to Paz Estenssoro. Instead, he installed the head of the Bolivian military, General Hugo Ballivián Rojas, as president on 16 May 1951 thus inflicting a coup against the democratic order. This came to be known as the "Mamertazo" of 1951. With the elections annulled and Ballivián firmly installed in the Palacio Quemado, Urriolagoitia left the country. Retired from politics, he returned in later years and died in his native Sucre on 4 June 1974, at the age of 78.

Mamerto Urriolagoitia is best remembered for his inflexibility — and for being the last constitutional president of the largely oligarchic social and political order that reigned in the country until the advent of the 1952 Bolivian National Revolution.

References

Bibliography 
Mesa, José de; Gisbert, Teresa; and Carlos D. Mesa, Historia de Bolivia, 3rd edition., pp. 579–587.

1895 births
1974 deaths
20th-century Bolivian lawyers
20th-century Bolivian politicians
Bolivian diplomats
Bolivian people of Basque descent
Foreign ministers of Bolivia
Knights Grand Cross of the Order of Isabella the Catholic
Members of the Senate of Bolivia
People from Sucre
Presidents of Bolivia
Presidents of the Senate of Bolivia
Republican Party (Bolivia) politicians
Republican Socialist Unity Party politicians
United Socialist Party (Bolivia) politicians
University of Saint Francis Xavier alumni
Vice presidents of Bolivia
Bolivian expatriates in France